Dragon Wagon may refer to:

M25 Tank Transporter, tractor-trailer combination built by Paccar and used in World War II
Heavy Expanded Mobility Tactical Truck, an American military transport vehicle
Heavy Equipment Transport System, a military logistics vehicle
Dragon Wagon (Indiana Beach), a roller coaster at the Indiana Beach amusement park

See also
Crescent Dragonwagon, an American writer